Me Gusta Todo de Ti (I Like Everything About You) is the title of a studio album released by Mexican group Banda El Recodo on 1 December 2009. This album includes the Billboard Top Latin Songs number-one single of the same name. It was released to celebrate the 70th anniversary of the band formation and comprises twelve tracks with different rhythms, such as ballads, charangas, corridos, cumbias and rancheras; a DVD was also recorded to illustrate the band history.

Track listing
The information from Allmusic.

Charts

Weekly charts

Year-end charts

Sales and certifications

References 

2009 albums
Banda el Recodo albums
Spanish-language albums
Fonovisa Records albums
Latin Grammy Award for Best Banda Album